Pierre Dufour is a Canadian politician and businessman, who was elected to the National Assembly of Quebec in the 2018 provincial election. He represents the electoral district of Abitibi-Est as a member of the Coalition Avenir Québec.

He previously ran as a Liberal Party of Canada candidate for the district of Abitibi—Baie-James—Nunavik—Eeyou in the 2015 federal election, but lost to the NDP's Romeo Saganash.

Cabinet posts

Electoral records

References

Living people
Coalition Avenir Québec MNAs
21st-century Canadian politicians
People from Val-d'Or
Liberal Party of Canada candidates for the Canadian House of Commons
Members of the Executive Council of Quebec
Year of birth missing (living people)